A Changed Man and Other Tales is a collection of twelve tales written by Thomas Hardy. The collection was originally published in book form in 1913, although all of the tales had been previously published in newspapers or magazines from 1881 to 1900.  There are eleven short stories and a novella The Romantic Adventures of a Milkmaid. At the end of the book there is a map of the imaginary Wessex of Hardy's novels and poems. Six of the stories were published before 1891 and therefore lacked international copyright protection when the collection began to be sold in October 1913.

Table of contents
 A Changed Man
 A Waiting Supper
 Alicia's Diary
 The Grave by the Handpost
 Enter a Dragoon
 A Tryst at an Ancient Earthwork
 What the Shepherd Saw
 A Committee-Man of 'The Terror'
 Master John Horseleigh, Knight
 The Duke's Reappearance
 A Mere Interlude
 The Romantic Adventures of a Milkmaid

References

External links

1913 short story collections
Short story collections by Thomas Hardy